Bernardo Rivavelarde is a Spanish digital artist and graphic designer.

Early life 
Rivavelarde was born in Santander, Spain. He studied graphic design at the Escuela de Comunicación Gráfica of Madrid.

Career 
Bernardo Rivavelarde presented in 1999 his first digital exhibition called Escuchando Imágenes (Listening to Images); a proposal to bring together art and graphic design. It offered a selection of images, animations, and interactive artworks. “Listening To Images” received major Spanish awards in graphic and artistic design, such as LAUS and MOBIUS awards. “Listening to Images” debuted at the Valle Quintana Gallery in Madrid. Bernardo collaborated musically with the Spanish Electronic Music Duo The Lab (Miguel Lázaro & José Corredera). “Listening to Images” was selected to be part of the exhibition "Signs of the Century, 100 Years of Graphic Design in Spain" that debuted at the Reina Sofia Museum, Madrid, Spain. “Listening to Images” was selected for the Spanish exhibition "Pasión, Spanish Design" at Berlin.

From 2000 to 2010 Bernardo worked for Nacho Duato, the artistic director for the Compañía Nacional de Danza of Spain. In 2014 Nacho Duato became artistic director of Staatsballet (Berlin). Bernardo returned to work for him in April 2014.

In 2003 Rivavelarde created a new exhibition Homodigitalis; a 30-minute animated movie divided into three parts—The Body, The Machine and The Future. Homodigitalis was screened at The National Library of Spain, Madrid, Spain. It also exhibited in Italy, Mexico and Germany. The music was created by The Lab. Homodigitalis the movie was released on DVD and its soundtrack on CD.

In 2005 and 2008 Bernardo Rivavelarde was selected by the publisher Taschen as a leading graphic designers in Graphic Design for the 21st Century, and Contemporary Graphic Design. 

In 2012, Bernardo presented his third exhibition Future Nature at the Museum Prince Felipe at The City of Arts and Sciences of Valencia, Spain. Future Nature includes images, sound landscapes, and motion graphics that show a new environment molded by new technologies. It displays the sea, the clouds, the trees, and the earth differently, offering an invitation to think about something new. The Lab composed the sound design. The exhibition was in Valencia from March 14, 2012, to January 7, 2013, but due to success with more than 1.5 million visitors, it was extended until April 14, 2013. Future Nature became a finalist at the 2011 Japan Media Art Festival (Tokyo) and got a mention at 2011 Prix Ars Electronica (Austria).Future Nature was selected to be shown in the 2012 Yota Space Festival in Saint Petersburg (Russia).

In 2021 Bernardo presents Portrait of an Artist in Santander (Spain).

Bernardo is included at USA Ranker

Works 
Escuchando Imágenes (Listening to images) 1999
Homodigitalis 2003
Future Nature 2012
Portrait of an Artist 2021

References

External links
Artist www.rivavelarde.com
Graphic Designer www.studio.rivavelarde.com

Living people
Spanish graphic designers
1970 births
Digital artists
People from Santander, Spain